Gwavas is a hamlet in the parish of Sithney, Cornwall, United Kingdom. Gwavas is adjoining Lowertown-by-Helston. The hamlet is a rural farming hamlet which once had a shop.

The hamlet is notable for a German plane crash during World War II, when a farmer here heard a loud noise and went out to find a plane crashed into his field. His wife made the German men cups of tea, while the farmer went in and cleaned the men's clothes and whistle.

References

Hamlets in Cornwall